The Stoa of Zeus at Athens, was a two-aisled stoa located in the northwest corner of the Ancient Agora of Athens. It was built c. 425 BC–410 BC for religious purposes in dedication to Zeus by the Eleutherios ("pertaining to freedom"): a cult founded after the Persian War. Stoas were not commonly used for religious purposes, but were typically built for promenades and meetings.

It is different from others in that it was a stoa rather than a temple (the common building used for religious purposes). Scholars believe the building also served other civic purposes due to its central location. Researchers think the structure may have been built by Mnesikles, the architect who built the Propylaia. The Propylaia was the Periclean gateway to the Acropolis. In the late first century BC a two-room annex was added, possibly for the cult of the Roman imperial family. The building in all was 43.56 meters by 10.73 meters.

References

External links
Stoa of Zeus Eleutherios

Ancient Agora of Athens
Ancient Greek buildings and structures in Athens
Stoas in Greece